Navi Peth is a posh area located in central Pune City, in Maharashtra State of the Republic of India established by British administration in year 1818. The name Navi means "new" in Marathi, is derived from the term "new" as compared to other peths is located next to Sadashiv Peth.

References

Peths in Pune